Bishungarh, also known as Vishungarh, is a village in the Indian state of Uttar Pradesh (UP). It is located in the Chhibramau tehsil  of Kannauj district.

History

Bishungarh is part of Chhibramau tehsil. In 1997,  when Farrukhabad district was divided into two district that is Farrukhabad and Kannauj. There after Chhibramau and Bishnugarh are part of southern Kannauj region.

Politics
The Bishungarh village falls under the Assembly constituency of Chhibramau and Lok Sabha constituency of Kannauj. Both Assembly and Loksabha constituencies are in the unreserved category.

Notable locations
 Aryavart Gramin Bank

Location

Bishungarh is 8 km from Chhibramau, which can be accessed via National Highway 91 (Delhi – Etah – Kannauj - Kanpur).

Agriculture
Potato, sugarcane, and tilhan (an oilseed) are the main agriculture products in the area.

References

Villages in Kannauj district